35th London Film Critics Circle Awards
18 January 2015

Film of the Year: 
Boyhood

British Film of the Year: 
Under the Skin

The 35th London Film Critics' Circle Awards, honouring the best in film for 2014, were announced by the London Film Critics' Circle on 18 January 2015.

Winners and nominees

Film of the Year
Boyhood
Birdman
The Grand Budapest Hotel
Ida
Leviathan
Mr. Turner
Nightcrawler
The Theory of Everything
Under the Skin

Foreign Language Film of the Year
Leviathan
Ida
Norte, the End of History
Two Days, One Night
Winter Sleep

British Film of the Year
Under the Skin
The Imitation Game
Mr. Turner
Pride
The Theory of Everything

Documentary of the Year
Citizenfour
20,000 Days on Earth
Manakamana
Next Goal Wins
Night Will Fall

Actor of the Year
Michael Keaton – Birdman
Benedict Cumberbatch – The Imitation Game
Jake Gyllenhaal – Nightcrawler
Eddie Redmayne – The Theory of Everything
Timothy Spall – Mr. Turner

Actress of the Year
Julianne Moore – Still Alice
Marion Cotillard – Two Days, One Night
Essie Davis – The Babadook
Scarlett Johansson – Under the Skin
Julianne Moore – Maps to the Stars

Supporting Actor of the Year
J. K. Simmons – Whiplash
Riz Ahmed – Nightcrawler
Ethan Hawke – Boyhood
Edward Norton – Birdman
Mark Ruffalo – Foxcatcher

Supporting Actress of the Year
Patricia Arquette – Boyhood
Marion Bailey – Mr. Turner
Jessica Chastain – A Most Violent Year
Agata Kulesza – Ida
Emma Stone – Birdman

British Actor of the Year
Timothy Spall – Mr. Turner 
Benedict Cumberbatch – The Imitation Game
Tom Hardy – Locke and The Drop
Jack O'Connell – Starred Up, '71 and Unbroken
Eddie Redmayne – The Theory of Everything

British Actress of the Year
Rosamund Pike – Gone Girl and What We Did on Our Holiday
Emily Blunt – Into the Woods and Edge of Tomorrow
Felicity Jones – The Theory of Everything
Keira Knightley – The Imitation Game, Begin Again and Say When
Gugu Mbatha-Raw – Belle

Young British Performer of the Year
Alex Lawther – The Imitation Game
Daniel Huttlestone – Into the Woods
Corey McKinley –  '71 
Will Poulter – The Maze Runner and Plastic
Saoirse Ronan – The Grand Budapest Hotel

Director of the Year
Richard Linklater – Boyhood
Wes Anderson – The Grand Budapest Hotel
Jonathan Glazer – Under the Skin
Alejandro G. Iñárritu – Birdman
Mike Leigh – Mr. Turner

Screenwriter of the Year
Wes Anderson – The Grand Budapest Hotel
Damien Chazelle – Whiplash
Dan Gilroy – Nightcrawler
Alejandro G. Iñárritu, Nicolás Giacobone, Alexander Dinelaris Jr., and Armando Bo – Birdman
Richard Linklater – Boyhood

Breakthrough British Filmmaker
Yann Demange –  '71 
Hossein Amini – The Two Faces of January
Elaine Constantine – Northern Soul
Iain Forsyth and Jane Pollard – 20,000 Days on Earth
James Kent – Testament of Youth

Technical Achievement
Under the Skin – Mica Levi, score
 '71  – Chris Wyatt, editing
Birdman – Emmanuel Lubezki, cinematography
Dawn of the Planet of the Apes – Joe Letteri, visual effects
The Grand Budapest Hotel – Adam Stockhausen, production design
Inherent Vice – Mark Bridges, costumes
Leviathan – Mikhail Krichman, cinematography
A Most Violent Year – Kasia Walicka-Maimone, costumes
Mr. Turner – Dick Pope, cinematography
Whiplash – Tom Cross, editing

Dilys Powell Award
Miranda Richardson

References

2
2014 film awards
2014 in British cinema
2014 in London
January 2015 events in the United Kingdom